Pagni is an Italian surname. Notable people with the surname include:

Benedetto Pagni (died 1578), Italian Mannerist painter
Eros Pagni (born 1939), Italian actor
Ferruccio Pagni (1866–1935), French-Italian painter
Sergio Pagni (born 1979), Italian archer

Italian-language surnames